Naomi Suzanne Fraga (born 1979) is an American botanist who is the Director of Conservation at the California Botanic Garden and research assistant professor of botany at Claremont Graduate University. She has focused her career on the conservation, monitoring and habitat restoration of rare plants across California. She was awarded the 2022 Center for Biological Diversity E.O. Wilson Award for Outstanding Science in Biodiversity Conservation.

Early life and education 

Fraga grew up in California. She was an undergraduate student at California State Polytechnic University, Pomona where she studied biology and botany. In 2002 she wrote a senior thesis on A Short Flora of Short Canyon, Kern County,California.

Starting from 2001 she worked as a volunteer at the herbarium of the California Botanic Garden — then named "Rancho Santa Ana Botanic Garden (RSABG)" — in Claremont, California.

She undertook her master studies in botany at the Claremont Graduate University, finishing in 2005 with a thesis on A Vascular Flora of the Owens Peak Eastern Watershed, southern Sierra, Kern County, California.

In 2015 she earned her Ph.D. with a dissertation on Phrymaceae, California Monkeyflowers.

Research and career 

Fraga works as a research assistant professor at Claremont Graduate University. She is responsible for the California Seed Bank which homes billions of seeds and the world's largest collection of native plant seeds from California.

Fraga campaigned to protect Tiehm's buckwheat (Eriogonum tiehmii), which was treated by the proposed construction of a lithium mine. Tiehm's buckwheat has suffered in the changing climate of California, particularly with the diminished rainfall, excess temperatures and reduction in groundwater. When Tiehm's buckwheat becomes stressed the plants that sprout do not produce viable seeds. She also monitors and maintains the Amargosa niterwort (Nitrophila mohavensis) and contributed to the recovery of the Hidden Lake bluecurls (Trichostema austromontanum subsp. compactum).

Awards and honors 
 2019 United States Fish and Wildlife Service Recovery Champion award
 2021 Center for Plant Conservation's Star Award
 2021 Center for Biological Diversity E.O. Wilson Award

Selected publications

References 

1979 births
Living people
Claremont Graduate University alumni
California State Polytechnic University, Pomona alumni
21st-century American botanists
Scientists from California